Kopsis Glacier is a  long and  wide glacier on the east side of north-central Sentinel Range in Ellsworth Mountains, Antarctica that is draining northeastwards from Panicheri Gap, Voysil Peak and Mount Gozur to join Embree Glacier northwest of Mirovyane Peak.

The glacier is named after the medieval town of Kopsis in Central Bulgaria.

Location
US mapping in 1961, updated in 1988.

See also
 List of glaciers in the Antarctic
 Antarctic Place-names Commission
 Glaciology

Maps
 Vinson Massif.  Scale 1:250 000 topographic map.  Reston, Virginia: US Geological Survey, 1988.
 Antarctic Digital Database (ADD). Scale 1:250000 topographic map of Antarctica. Scientific Committee on Antarctic Research (SCAR). Since 1993, regularly updated.

Notes

References
 Kopsis Glacier SCAR Composite Antarctic Gazetteer
 Bulgarian Antarctic Gazetteer. Antarctic Place-names Commission. (details in Bulgarian, basic data in English)

External links
 Kopsis Glacier. Copernix satellite image

Glaciers of Ellsworth Land
Bulgaria and the Antarctic